Pterolobium microphyllum is a flowering plant in the family Fabaceae. They are perennial climbing shrubs that occur from Burma eastwards to Thailand, Laos, Cambodia, Vietnam, Malaysia and  Indonesia.

They bear erect creamy coloured inflorescences and colourful samaroid fruit typical of their genus, and have pairs of thorns below the rachis of their bipinnate leaves. The minute leaflets and the rachis have a rufous tone before they mature.

External links
 
 
 Range and synonyms: Pterolobium hexapetalum, LegumeWeb, from ILDIS World Database of Legumes

microphyllum
Flora of Malesia
Flora of Indo-China